David William Frye (born June 21, 1961) is an American former professional football player who was a linebacker in the National Football League (NFL) for seven seasons. During his NFL career, he played for the Atlanta Falcons and Miami Dolphins. Frye played collegiately at Purdue University.

References

1961 births
Living people
American football linebackers
Atlanta Falcons players
Miami Dolphins players
Players of American football from Cincinnati
Purdue Boilermakers football players